Dippy is a composite Diplodocus skeleton in Pittsburgh's Carnegie Museum of Natural History, and the holotype of the species Diplodocus carnegii. It is considered the most famous single dinosaur skeleton in the world, due to the numerous plaster casts donated by Andrew Carnegie to several major museums around the world at the beginning of the 20th century.

The casting and distribution of the skeleton made the word dinosaur a household word; for millions of people it became the first dinosaur they had ever seen. It was also responsible for the subsequent popularity of the entire genus Diplodocus, since the skeleton has been on display in more places than any other sauropod dinosaur.

Its discovery was catalyzed by the announcement of the excavation of a large thigh bone (unrelated to Dippy) by William Harlow Reed near Medicine Bow, Wyoming in December 1898. On a return trip financed by Carnegie, Reed excavated Sheep Creek Quarry D in which he found the first part of Dippy's skeleton, a toe bone, on July 4, 1899. Its discovery on Independence Day, and its use in American diplomacy via Carnegie's international donations of replicas, led to its being nicknamed the "star-spangled dinosaur". Dippy became the centrepiece of the Carnegie Museum of Natural History, such that the museum became known as "the house that Dippy built".

In 2016, a petition to the International Commission on Zoological Nomenclature was being considered which proposed to make Diplodocus carnegii the new type species of Diplodocus. The proposal was rejected in 2018, and D. longus has been maintained as the type species.

Discovery 

The skeleton was found in the upper  of the Talking Rock facies of the Brushy Basin Member of the Morrison Formation, in Albany County, Wyoming.

In 1900, John Bell Hatcher was hired by William Jacob Holland as curator of paleontology and osteology for the Carnegie Museum of Natural History, succeeding Jacob Lawson Wortman. Hatcher supervised the field expeditions, excavations, investigation and display of Dippy, and named the species for Carnegie. Hatcher's monograph on the find was published in 1901 as Diplodocus Marsh: Its Osteology, Taxonomy, and Probable Habits, with a Restoration of the Skeleton.

It is a composite skeleton comprising:
 CM 84: the majority of the skeleton, named Diplodocus carnegii, and published in 1901 by Hatcher
 CM 94: supplemented missing bones
 CM 307: the tail
 CM 662 and USNM 2673: skull elements. In 2015, the USNM skull was recategorized as Galeamopus, along with several other Diplodocus skulls, leaving no definite Diplodocus skulls known.
 some foot and limb bones of a Camarasaurus

Pittsburgh display 

The original skeleton has been on display at the Carnegie Museum of Natural History since April 1907, two years after the first cast was shown. The delay was due to construction work at the Pittsburgh museum, which needed expansion in order to house Dippy. Today, the skeleton is part of the Dinosaurs in Their Time exhibition.

Casts

Background
Industrialist Andrew Carnegie financed the acquisition of the skeleton in 1898, as well as the donation of the casts at the beginning of the 20th century. His great-grandson, William Thomson, was quoted in 2019 explaining the donations: "By gifting copies to the heads of state of seven other countries as well as the UK, Carnegie hoped to demonstrate through mutual interest in scientific discoveries that nations have more in common than what separates them. He used his gifts in an attempt to open inter state dialogue on preserving world peace – a form of Dinosaur diplomacy."

London cast

The London cast of Dippy came about when King Edward VII, then a keen trustee of the British Museum, saw a sketch of the bones at Carnegie's Scottish home, Skibo Castle, in 1902, and Carnegie agreed to donate a cast to the Natural History Museum as a gift.  Carnegie paid £2,000 for the casting in plaster of paris, copying the original fossil bones held by the Carnegie Museum (not mounted until 1907, as a new museum building was still being constructed to house it).
The cast was mounted in the museum's Reptile Gallery to the left of the main hall (now the gallery of Human Biology) as it was too large to display in the Fossil Reptile Gallery (to the right of the main hall; now the gallery of Creepy Crawlies).

Dippy was taken to pieces and stored in the museum's basement during the Second World War to protect it from bomb damage, and reinstalled in the Reptile Gallery after the war.  The original presentation of the cast was altered several times to reflect changes in scientific opinion on the animal's stance.  The head and neck were originally posed in a downwards position, and were later moved to a more horizontal position in the 1960s.

Dippy was removed from the Reptile Gallery in 1979 and repositioned as the centrepiece of the main central hall of the museum, later renamed the Hintze Hall in recognition of a large donation by Michael Hintze. Dippy replaced a mounted African elephant, nicknamed George, which had been on display as the central exhibit in the main hall since 1907, with various other animal specimens. The elephant had itself replaced the skeleton of a sperm whale which was the first significant exhibit in the hall and had been on display since at least 1895: earlier, the hall had been left largely empty. Dippy was originally displayed alongside a cast of a Triceratops skeleton, which was removed around 1993.  The tail of the Diplodocus cast was also lifted to waft over the heads of visitors; originally it drooped to trail along the floor.

The cast became an iconic representation of the museum. The work involved in removing Dippy and replacing it with the whale skeleton was documented in a BBC Television special, Horizon: Dippy and the Whale, narrated by David Attenborough, which was first broadcast on BBC Two on July 13, 2017, the day before the whale skeleton was unveiled for public display.

Dippy started a tour of British museums in February 2018, mounted on a new, more mobile armature. Dippy is and has been on display at locations around the United Kingdom: Dorset County Museum (February 10 – May 7, 2018),  Birmingham Museum and Art Gallery (26 May – September 9, 2018), Ulster Museum (September 17, 2018 – January 6, 2019), Kelvingrove Art Gallery and Museum, the Great North Museum, the National Museum of Wales, Number One Riverside in Rochdale, and Norwich Cathedral.

Other casts
As director of the Carnegie Museums, William Holland supervised the donations of the casts. His trip to Argentina in 1912 was recorded by Holland in his 1913 travel book To the River Plate and Back. Holland noted a poem which had become popular among college students:
Crowned heads of Europe
All make a royal fuss
Over Uncle Andy 
And his old diplodocus.

Known casts include:

Pittsburgh statue

In 1999 a public sculpture of Dippy was unveiled on the grounds of the Carnegie Institute and Library complex in the Oakland neighborhood of Pittsburgh, Pennsylvania, in tribute to the 100th anniversary of the discovery of Dippy. The dark, grayish brown life-size fiberglass model weighs , stands , and measures  in length. The sculpture was created during a nine-month process from the original fossil. Sited along Forbes Avenue near Schenley Plaza and the lawn of the University of Pittsburgh's Cathedral of Learning, Dippy stands adjacent to the entrances of the Carnegie Music Hall and the Carnegie Museum of Natural History.

In addition to its service as a mascot for the museum, Dippy has been seen sporting the Terrible Towel of the Pittsburgh Steelers and the colors of University of Pittsburgh's athletic teams. Sometimes when it's cold out the staff dresses him up with a gigantic scarf. Dippy is a featured Pittsburgh landmark on Yinztagram.

Gallery

See also 
 Gordo (dinosaur)
 Sophie the Stegosaurus
 Sue (dinosaur)
 Archie (squid)

References

Bibliography

Editio princeps 

 Diplodocus Marsh: Its Osteology, Taxonomy, and Probable Habits, with a Restoration of the Skeleton, 1901

Secondary sources 

 
 
 
 Brezinski, D. K., & Kollar, A. D. (2008), Geology of the Carnegie Museum dinosaur quarry site of Diplodocus carnegii, Sheep Creek, Wyoming. Annals of Carnegie Museum, 77(2), 243–252.
 
 Breithaupt, Brent H, The discovery and loss of the “colossal” Brontosaurus giganteus from the fossil fields of Wyoming (USA) and the events that led to the discovery of Diplodocus carnegii: the first mounted dinosaur on the Iberian Peninsula, VI Jornadas Internacionales sobre Paleontología de Dinosaurios y su Entorno, September 5–7, 2013, pp. 48–50

External links 

 Dippy at the Carnegie Museum of Natural History
 Diplodocus : this is your life, Natural History Museum
 Dippy on Tour, Natural History Museum
 Taking Dippy down: the first steps, Natural History Museum
 Natural History Museum unveils 'Dippy' the Diplodocus replacement Hope the blue whale, The Independent, July 14, 2017
 Bone Wars: The Excavation and Celebrity of Andrew Carnegie's Dinosaur, Tom Rea, pp. 1–11
Bob Batz, Jr. (1999). Dippy the dinosaur sculpture installation: story from the Pittsburgh Post-Gazette. Retrieved May 16, 2007.

Outdoor sculptures in Pennsylvania
Parks in Pittsburgh
Dinosaur sculptures
1999 sculptures
Fiberglass sculptures in Pennsylvania
1999 establishments in Pennsylvania
Carnegie Museum of Natural History
Diplodocids
Dinosaur fossils
Jurassic fossil record